John Franklin "Johnny" Mitchell (August 9, 1894 – November 4, 1965) was an American professional baseball shortstop. He played five seasons in Major League Baseball (MLB) between 1921 and 1925 for the New York Yankees, Boston Red Sox, Brooklyn Robins.

In 329 games over five seasons, Mitchell posted a .245 batting average (288-for-1175) with 152 runs, 2 home runs, 64 RBIs and 119 bases on balls. Defensively, he recorded a .953 fielding percentage.

Six years after he retired, Mitchell died of a heart attack at a nursing home on November 4, 1965. He was survived by his daughter, Beatrice Rogers.

References

External links

1894 births
1965 deaths
Major League Baseball shortstops
Brooklyn Robins players
New York Yankees players
Boston Red Sox players
Baseball players from Michigan
Adrian Champs players
Adrian Fencevilles players
Ottawa Senators (baseball) players
Memphis Chickasaws players
Terre Haute Highlanders players
Grand Rapids Black Sox players
Vernon Tigers players
Minneapolis Millers (baseball) players
Los Angeles Angels (minor league) players
Mission Reds players